Adrienne Levine (June 24, 1966 – November 1, 2006), better known by the stage name Adrienne Shelly (sometimes credited as Adrienne Shelley), was an American actress, film director and screenwriter.  She became known for roles in independent films such as Hal Hartley's The Unbelievable Truth (1989) and Trust (1990). She wrote, co-starred in, and directed the 2007 posthumously-released film Waitress which later became a Broadway show.

Shelly's death in 2006 was initially determined by police to be suicide; her husband's insistence on a re-evaluation brought her killer to justice.

Shelly's husband established the Adrienne Shelly Foundation, which awards scholarships, production grants, finishing funds, and living stipends to artists. In her honor, the Women Film Critics Circle gives an annual Adrienne Shelly Award to the film that it finds "most passionately opposes violence against women."

Early life 
Shelly was born Adrienne Levine in Queens to Sheldon Levine and Elaine Langbaum. She had two brothers and was raised on Long Island. She began performing when she was about 10 at Stagedoor Manor Performing Arts Training Center. Shelly made her professional debut in a summer stock production of the musical Annie while a student at Jericho High School in Jericho, New York. She went on to Boston University, majoring in film production, but dropped out after her junior year and moved to Manhattan.

Career 
Shelly's breakthrough came when she was cast by independent filmmaker Hal Hartley as the lead in The Unbelievable Truth (1989) and Trust (1990). Trust was nominated for the Grand Jury Prize at the Sundance Film Festival, where Hartley's script tied for the Waldo Salt Screenwriting Award. Shelly guest-starred in a number of television series including Law & Order, Oz and Homicide: Life on the Street, and played major roles in over two dozen off-Broadway plays, often at Manhattan's Workhouse Theater. In 2005 she appeared in the film Factotum starring Matt Dillon.

During the 1990s, Shelly segued toward a career behind the camera.  She wrote and directed 1999's I'll Take You There, in which she appeared alongside Ally Sheedy. She won a U.S. Comedy Arts Festival Film Discovery Jury Award in 2000 for direction of the film, and Prize of the City of Setúbal: Special Mention, at the Festróia (Tróia International Film Festival) held in Setúbal, Portugal, for best director. Her final work was writing, directing, co-set- and costume-designing, and acting in the film Waitress, starring Keri Russell and Nathan Fillion, which premiered at the 2007 Sundance Film Festival. Shelly's daughter, Sophie, has a cameo at the end of the film.

Personal life 
Shelly, who took her professional surname from her late father's given name, was married to Andy Ostroy, the chairman and CEO of the marketing firm Belardi/Ostroy. They met in 2001 on Match.com, were married in 2002, and had a daughter, Sophie (born 2003), who was two years old at the time of her mother's death. Shelly had written the film Waitress during the time she was pregnant with her daughter, Sophie.  Shelly described herself as an "optimistic agnostic."

Death and investigation 
Shelly was found dead at approximately 5:45 p.m on November 1, 2006. Her husband, Andy Ostroy, discovered her body in the Abingdon Square apartment in Manhattan's West Village that she used as an office. Ostroy had dropped her off at 9:30 a.m. He became concerned that Shelly had not been in contact during the day and asked the doorman to accompany him to the apartment. They found her body hanging from a shower rod in the bathtub with a bed sheet around her neck.

Although the door was unlocked and money was missing from her wallet, the NYPD believed Shelly had taken her own life. An autopsy found she had died as a result of neck compression. Ostroy insisted that his wife was happy in her personal and professional life, and would never have committed suicide leaving her two-and-a-half-year-old daughter motherless. His protests over the following days prompted further examination of the bathroom, which revealed a sneaker print in gypsum dust on the toilet beside where her body had been found. The print was matched to other shoe prints in the building where construction work had been done the day of Shelly's death.

Diego Pillco, a 19-year-old construction worker from Ecuador, was arrested on November 6 and confessed on tape to attacking Shelly and staging the fake suicide. Pillco's original version claimed that when Shelly demanded the construction noise be kept down, he threw a hammer at her. Afraid she might make a complaint that could result in his deportation, since he had immigrated into the United States illegally, he followed her back to her apartment. Pillco said Shelly slapped him when he grabbed her at her apartment door and he retaliated by punching her in the face, knocking her to the ground where she hit her head and fell unconscious. Believing he had killed her, he then hanged her to make it appear a suicide. This version of events was not supported given the lack of head trauma and the presence of neck compression as the cause of death.

Pillco gave a different account during trial in 2008. He said he was returning to work after lunch when he noticed Shelly returning to her apartment in the elevator, and decided to follow and rob her. He said he waited on the landing of Shelly's apartment as she entered and left the door open, and intended to steal from her purse. When Shelly caught him and threatened to call police, he grabbed the phone and covered her mouth to quiet her screaming. After rendering Shelly unconscious, Pillco bound a bed sheet around her neck and strangled her. He then dragged her to the bathroom where he hung her body from the shower rod to make her death look like suicide.

The second version was consistent with the lack of dust on Shelly's shoes which she was not wearing when found, and was apparently a confession to murder. Prosecutors thought if charged with murder Pillco might return to his original account and a jury trial could find him guilty of a lesser charge. The medical examiner determined that Shelly was still alive when hanged. Pillco pleaded guilty to first-degree manslaughter and was sentenced to 25 years in prison without parole. Since he is an illegal immigrant, he is scheduled to be deported to Ecuador upon release.

At Pillco's sentencing on March 13, 2008, Shelly's husband and family members said that they would never forgive him. Andy Ostroy said of Pillco "...you are nothing more than a cold-blooded killer" and that he hoped he would "rot in jail."

Ostroy said that "Adrienne was the kindest, warmest, most loving, generous person I knew. She was incredibly smart, funny and talented, a bright light with an infectious laugh and huge smile that radiated inner and outer beauty... she was my best friend, and the person with whom I was supposed to grow old."

Lawsuit 
According to an acquaintance, Pillco said after eight months he still owed a debt on the $12,000 he had paid to be smuggled into the US, and he lived in the basement of a building owned by his employer. One of Shelly's neighbors told reporters that Pillco's stare had made the neighbor feel uncomfortable when she walked past him. Shelly's husband sued contractor Bradford General Contractors, which had hired Pillco. The complaint alleged that Shelly would still be alive if the contracting firm had not hired him.

Ostroy also sought to hold the owners and management of the building liable for Shelly's murder. According to a New York Post article, among other allegations, the complaint stated that Pillco was an undocumented immigrant...' as were his co-workers, and that "it was in Bradford General Contractors' interest not to have 'police and immigration officials [called] to the job site' because that would have ground their work to a halt."

On July 7, 2011, the lawsuit was dismissed by Judge Louis York. The court determined that Ostroy had not established legal grounds to hold the contractor liable, writing "While this court sympathizes with [Ostroy's] loss, plaintiffs have not presented sufficient legal grounds upon which to hold Bradford ... liable for Pillco's vicious crime," and that there was likewise insufficient evidence presented to find that either the building's management agents or its owners "had reason to believe that Pillco was a dangerous person who should not have been allowed to work at the premises" in order to find them vicariously liable. Ostroy was said to be considering an appeal.

Legacy 

Following his wife's death, Ostroy established the Adrienne Shelly Foundation, a nonprofit organization that awards scholarships, production grants, finishing funds, and living stipends through its partnerships with academic and filmmaking institutions NYU, Columbia University, Women in Film, IFP, AFI, Sundance Institute, Tribeca Film Institute, and the Nantucket Film Festival. One of its grant recipients, Cynthia Wade, won an Academy Award in 2008 for Freeheld, a short-subject documentary that the Foundation had helped fund. The foundation gave an early short film grant to Chloé Zhao, who eight years later became the second woman in history to win the Academy Award for Best Director. As part of its annual awards, the Women Film Critics Circle gives the Adrienne Shelly Award to the film that "most passionately opposes violence against women."

On February 16, 2007, the NBC crime drama series Law & Order broadcast a season 17 episode titled, "Melting Pot", which was a loose dramatization of Shelly's murder. Shelly herself had guest starred on the show in the 2000 episode "High & Low". The plot of "Melting Pot" contains an alteration of the events wherein the murder is committed by the employer of the undocumented construction worker in an attempt to protect his lucrative business.

Shelly's film Waitress was accepted into the 2007 Sundance Film Festival before her murder. The film, starring Keri Russell, Nathan Fillion, Cheryl Hines, Jeremy Sisto, Andy Griffith, and Shelly herself, was bought during the festival by Fox Searchlight Pictures for an amount between $4 million and $5 million (news accounts on the actual amount vary), and the film realized a final box-office draw of more than $19 million. Waitress maintains a 90% "fresh" rating on Rotten Tomatoes.

Waitress and its cast have together won five film awards and received other nominations in various categories, including an Audience award for a feature film at the Newport Beach Film Festival, where cast member Nathan Fillion received a Feature Film award for his role in the film; the Jury Prize at the Sarasota Film Festival for narrative feature; the Wyatt Award by the Southeastern Film Critics Association Awards; and nominations for a Humanitas Prize and an Independent Spirit Award for best screenplay.

Ostroy produced Serious Moonlight, a film written by Shelly and directed by Hines. The film stars Meg Ryan, Timothy Hutton, Kristen Bell, and Justin Long. It premiered at the Tribeca Film Festival in April 2009 and was released later that year in December.

Ostroy spearheaded the establishment of a memorial to his wife. On August 3, 2009, the Adrienne Shelly Garden was dedicated on the Southeast side of Abingdon Square Park at 8th Avenue and West 12th Street. It faces 15 Abingdon Square, the building where Shelly died.

The musical Waitress, based on the motion picture written by Shelly, opened on August 1, 2015, at the American Repertory Theater at Harvard University. It was directed by Diane Paulus and featured a book by Jessie Nelson and music and lyrics by Sara Bareilles. It starred Jessie Mueller, winner of a Tony Award for her portrayal of Carole King in the musical Beautiful. After a sold-out limited engagement, the show moved to Broadway, starting in previews March 25, 2016, and officially opening April 24, 2016. The production closed on January 5, 2020, after 33 previews and 1,544 performances.

Shelly's murder and police investigation is dramatized in season 4, episode 2 of the Investigation Discovery television series, The Perfect Murder. She is portrayed by actress Emily Stokes.

Ostroy directed a documentary about Shelly's life, titled Adrienne in which he meets and has a conversation with Diego Pillco in prison. It premiered on December 1, 2021, on HBO.

Filmography

References

External links 

 
 The Adrienne Shelly Foundation
 Jones, Malcolm; "Murder Victim Was A Great Actress"; Newsweek; November 10, 2006.
 Beyond Belief (TCM Movie Morlocks) 

1966 births
2006 deaths
2006 murders in the United States
20th-century American actresses
21st-century American actresses
Actresses from New York City
American agnostics
American film actresses
American people of Russian-Jewish descent
American women film directors
American women screenwriters
American writers of Russian descent
Boston University College of Communication alumni
Deaths by strangulation in the United States
Film directors from New York City
Jewish American actresses
Jewish American writers
Jewish agnostics
Murdered American Jews
People from Greenwich Village
People from Jericho, New York
People murdered in New York City
Screenwriters from New York (state)
Writers from Queens, New York
20th-century American women writers
20th-century American writers
American television actresses
Deaths by hanging
20th-century American screenwriters